Calagrassor tashiensis is a species of sea snail, a marine gastropod mollusk in the family Eosiphonidae, the true whelks and their allies.

Description

Distribution
This marine species occurs off Taiwan.

References

The extensive Indo-Pacific deep-water radiation of Manaria E. A. Smith, 1906 (Gastropoda: Buccinidae) and related genera, with descriptions of 21 new species, in HEROS V., STRONG E. & BOUCHET P. (eds), Tropical Deep-Sea Benthos 29. Mémoires du Muséum national d'Histoire naturelle 208: 363-456

External links
  Kantor Yu.I., Puillandre N., Fraussen K., Fedosov A.E. & Bouchet P. (2013) Deep-water Buccinidae (Gastropoda: Neogastropoda) from sunken wood, vents and seeps: Molecular phylogeny and taxonomy. Journal of the Marine Biological Association of the United Kingdom, 93(8): 2177–2195

Eosiphonidae
Gastropods described in 2002